Gilles De Bilde (born 9 June 1971) is a retired Belgian footballer who played as a striker. He played club football for Eendracht Aalst, Anderlecht, PSV, Sheffield Wednesday, Aston Villa, Lierse and Willebroek-Meerhof. He was capped by Belgium at international level.

Club career
At Eendracht Aalst, he won the 1994 Belgian Player of the Year and scored 21 goals in 33 league games during the 1994–95 season. He joined Anderlecht in the summer of 1995 and managed a further 22 goals in 46 Belgian First Division matches. In a match between Anderlecht and Aalst in December 1996, he punched Krist Porte in the face, which broke his nose and injured his eye. Previously, De Bilde received a suspended two-year prison sentence in 1992 for head-butting two boy scout leaders and, four months before the Porte incident, he head-butted one nurse and punched another when he was denied access to a hospital room his father was in, having suffered a brain haemorrhage. Johan Boskamp, Anderlecht's head coach, suggested that De Bilde should see a psychiatrist.

In January 1997, De Bilde was transferred to Dutch side PSV for £3m. During his time in Eindhoven, he scored 24 goals in 49 Eredivisie matches. His seven goals in eight league matches during the second half of the 1996–97 season helped PSV become Dutch champions. He joined Sheffield Wednesday in August 1999 and scored ten league goals in his first season with the club, but was unable to prevent them from being relegated from the Premier League. In October 2000, he joined Aston Villa on loan for three months. He made four league appearances for the club, without scoring, and returned to Sheffield Wednesday in January 2001, where he stayed for the remainder of the season after a number of potential transfers failed to materialise. He returned to Anderlecht in July 2001 on a free transfer, having signed a three-year contract. Two years later, De Bilde joined Lierse, where he finished his professional career at the end of the 2003–04 season. He played for Willebroek-Meerhof of the Belgian Promotion between 2005 and 2007. De Bilde – who campaigned for a European ban on cat and dog fur – was fined by the club in 2006 for missing a match to mourn the death of one of his dogs.

International career
De Bilde was capped 25 times by Belgium at international level. He was a member of the squad at Euro 2000 and made one appearance at the finals, in a 2–0 defeat against Turkey.

Post-retirement
After retiring, De Bilde became a regular football analyst on Belgian television, featuring on their domestic and Champions League coverage. He appeared as a model for Belgian fashion designer Dirk Bikkembergs, and has appearances on television shows involving celebrity challenges, including Dancing on Ice and Celebrity Shock.

Honours

Club 
Anderlecht

 Belgian Supercup: 1995, 2001

PSV Eindhoven

 Eredivisie: 1996–97
 KNVB Cup: 1997–98 (runners-up)
 Johan Cruijff Shield: 1996, 1997

Individual 

 Belgian Second Division Top scorer: 1993–94 (16 goals)
 Belgian Golden Shoe: 1994

References

External links
 
 

1971 births
Living people
Belgian footballers
Belgium international footballers
Flemish sportspeople
Belgian Pro League players
Challenger Pro League players
Association football forwards
S.C. Eendracht Aalst players
R.S.C. Anderlecht players
Sheffield Wednesday F.C. players
Aston Villa F.C. players
PSV Eindhoven players
Lierse S.K. players
UEFA Euro 2000 players
Premier League players
English Football League players
Eredivisie players
Belgian expatriate sportspeople in the Netherlands
Belgian expatriate footballers
Expatriate footballers in the Netherlands
Expatriate footballers in England
Belgian expatriate sportspeople in England